St. Bede's College is a women's college in Navbahar, Shimla, Himachal Pradesh, India. The college was originally established as a teacher's training institute in 1904 by the Religious of Jesus and Mary.

Today, it offers courses in Commerce, Arts, Sciences, Economics, English, Geography, Microbiology, etc. and is the only college in Himachal Pradesh to receive an 'A+' re-accreditation by UGC-NAAC. Students are commonly known as Bedians.

Notable alumni

 Ish Amitoj Kaur, United States-based filmmaker 
 Kalpana Kartik, former Bollywood actress
 Meera Shankar, former ambassador of India to the United States
 Pratibha Singh, Indian National Congress politician 
 Preity Zinta, actress
 Tavleen Singh, journalist
 Persis Khambatta, former model
 Preneet Kaur, former Minister of State for External Affairs
 Priya Rajvansh, former Indian film actress 
 Rubina Dilaik, Bollywood actress 
 Shazia Ilmi, Politician 
 Shipra Khanna, winner of MasterChef India (season 2)
 Mona Grey, British nurse, first Chief Nursing Officer of Northern Ireland and secretary of the Royal College of Nursing in Northern Ireland

References

Universities and colleges in Himachal Pradesh
Education in Shimla
Educational institutions established in 1904
1904 establishments in India
Schools in Colonial India
Arts colleges in India

British-era buildings in Himachal Pradesh